Herrys is a surname. Notable people with the surname include:

Edward Herrys (1612–1662), MP for Maldon (1660)
Christopher Herrys (1599–1628), MP for Harwich (1624–1628 not continuously)

See also
Herries
Harris (surname)